The Record Herald is an American daily newspaper published in Waynesboro, Pennsylvania.  It was established as Blue Ridge Zephyr when it started publishing on July 2, 1894. It is presently owned by Gannett.

In addition to the borough of Waynesboro, The Record Herald covers several communities in Franklin County, Pennsylvania, including Antrim Township, Blue Ridge Summit, Greencastle, Mont Alto and Washington Township. It also circulates across the state line in Cascade, Maryland, and environs.

Echo Pilot
The Record Herald has a satellite bureau in Greencastle and also produces a weekly newspaper, the Echo Pilot, serving that borough.

Notable staff
Ed Koterba, reporter, columnist, and feature writer from 1946 until 1952

References

External links
 The Record Herald - therecordherald.com
 Echo-Pilot - echo-pilot.com
GateHouse Media

Daily newspapers published in Pennsylvania
Franklin County, Pennsylvania
Publications established in 1894
Gannett publications